The presidency of Gustavo Petro started on 7 August 2022. He was elected the 34th president of Colombia on 19 June 2022 by obtaining 55.1% of the valid votes in the 2022 Colombian presidential election, defeating Rodolfo Hernández Suárez in the second-round run-off.

Background
At the time of his election, Petro was a 62-year-old member of Congress; his victory has been attributed to voter anger at the political class over years of corruption in politics, economic recession, the COVID-19 health crisis and a rise in violent crime. According to the political scientist Paca Zuleta, "the discontent over the economic crisis, it seems to me, was channeled together with a speech about combating poverty and not responding in the way that his detractors expected". Colombia's economy was recovering from the crisis, with an unemployment rate of 28 percent at the time of the elections, twice as high as five years earlier. The crisis was caused, among other factors, by the weakness of the prices of raw materials; the events revealed underlying weaknesses in the economy, including poor infrastructure, excessive bureaucracy, an inefficient tax system, and corruption.

Administration
Petro was inaugurated alongside Francia Márquez, the second woman, first Afro-Colombian vice president.

On 8 August 2022, after taking office as President of Colombia, Petro announced who would be the ministers at the beginning of his government, and announced José Antonio Ocampo as the Minister of Finance and Public Credit, formerly the minister with same portfolio in the government of Ernesto Samper.

Cabinet

Domestic policy

Taxes
After the failure of the tax reform of the Duque administration, the Petro government took on the task of creating one where the population with the least economic accessibility would be the least affected, the government has emphasized the importance of reducing taxes for the population with less income, and a greater number of taxes for the population with higher income.

Energy
On 8 September, the Minister of Mines and Energy, Irene Veléz, had what she called a meeting to listen to the companies that provide the service, the unions, the mayors and other actors with the aim of establishing a path towards stabilizing the main anguish of Caribbean citizenship.

The minister insisted that there is another Colombia that has different and no less worrying challenges: "It is about the more than 500 thousand families that still do not have access to energy at the national level"

On 28 October, during his visit to the municipality of Bosconia, César Petro declared this measure a state of National Emergency in order to allocate the economic resources that remain from this year's budget to face emergencies immediately, according to Petro.

"Cesar lives a paradox that focuses on the climate crisis, I said it in my electoral campaign, here you suffer but this region also produces the chemicals that generate this pollution: coal".

Environment and climate
On 7 November 2022, Petro traveled to Egypt with a delegation of 201 people to discuss and rethink solutions for climate change, one of his main banners was saving the Amazon and protecting water, Petro fired at everyone, including technocrats, in a veiled reference to his predecessor, Iván Duque, who was also at the climate summit promoting one of his books. From the summit, he wanted a common fund with other countries such as Brazil, Peru, Venezuela or the United States to protect the Amazon. Colombia, he announced, will allocate 140 million dollars a year for the next 20 years.

For Andrés Santiago Arroyave, an expert on environmental issues, what the president is asking for, beyond what is said in the decalogue, is that the necessary changes be accelerated to achieve the goals of reducing between 30% and 40% of the greenhouse gas emissions by 2030 and achieve carbon neutrality (countries generating the amount of greenhouse gases they can offset) by 2050.

However, he says that something that can generate resistance is that Petro speaks in terms of changes that must take place now, and is taking away the strength of the transition. "From an environmental perspective, the president's timing is correct; There is no longer a deadline to make less immediate changes. But if you look at it in the context of an economic crisis, recession and war, it's different", says Arroyave.

He thinks that it is very difficult for Colombia to give up the generation of fossil fuels in the short term, it is very complex because it is the main economic support of the country. "As tight as the schedule is to stop the advance of climate change, making an abrupt change in this area is something that the economy does not allow. What we can gain, from Colombia, with the insistence on the urgency of the Petro changes is that Ecopetrol increase efforts for the transition, which is something in which this country has a lot of potential. There is a lot of room to grow in wind power and solar power production," he says.

On January 20, 2023, he traveled to Davos, Switzerland to participate in the World Economic Forum, where at the end of his speech at the Petro he spoke about the intentions of the national government to lead an energy transition that allows the development of other industries, like tourism. In fact, during his presidential campaign he has insisted on the need for this sector to have significant economic empowerment, but for this a pacification plan is needed in the country.

From there arose the proposal to implement Total Peace, now understood as a State policy. The president stated that one of the steps to take is to invest in the tourism sector, "we are convinced that, with a strong investment in tourism, given the beauty of the country, and the capacity and potential that the country has in generating clean energy , could perfectly, in a short term, in a transition, fill the gaps that the fossil economy can leave”, said the Head of State when closing his speech at the Davos Forum.

Biodiversity
As Colombia is a biodiversity hotspot, the administration planned to “carry out fundamental transformations to face the emergency caused by climate change and the loss of biodiversity”. In a speech to the UN, Petro connected the "irrational war on drugs" to the destruction of the rainforest ecosystems, as the eradication of the coca plant through glyphosate or fire causes harm to many other nearby plants and poisons the water in the former case. On 10 January 2023, the National Police of Colombia reduced their target coca eradication goal by 60% for 2023.

Education
On 17 November 2022 during an intervention in Pinillos, Bolívar Petro announced changes in the education sector focusing on secondary school, Petro assured that the country's education system has to make a transition to the model that is managed on the European continent.

The president concluded the announcement by saying that the ideal would be for this model to be implemented in the Los Pinillos school, "to ensure that the best public education in Colombia can be established in the region that had one of the best educations in the times of the origin of the Republic of Colombia”.

Defence
On December 17, President Gustavo Petro commented to various media outlets that the National Government is contemplating the idea of ​​renewing the fleet of combat aircraft of the Colombian Air Force (FAC). According to the president, the announcement corresponds to the renewal of the Kfir aircraft fleet, of Israeli origin and that by next year they would be obsolete, because they have been in operation for more than 30 years, the president quoted in verbatim words. I believe that the wives of the current pilots are going to thank me very much, because in reality it was already dangerous to climb on those devices”, said Gustavo Petro in the middle of the promotion ceremony for officers of the Military Forces.

Later the Minister of Defense argued in exact words “it is a reality that these planes must be bought and the French planes are the leading proposal. The Dassault Rafale could arrive in 2025 and the old ones would stop leaving service next year”, said Velásquez and stated that this decision had been considered for 12 years.

Total peace

Already during his campaign for president, Gustavo Petro introduced his ideas for a "total peace" in Colombia, which aims for an all encompassing and lasting peace in Colombia, using a two-pronged strategy of reducing social inequality and expanding upon the policy of peacemeal negotiations with armed groups of his predecessors. This set of policies included a renewal of peace talks with the remaining left- and right-wing armed groups to the Colombian conflict, particularly the ELN, as well as plea-bargaining benefits to paramilitary successor groups, like the AGC and FARC dissidents. On 4 November 2022, Petro signed into law a "total peace" bill, codifying negotiation conditions with armed groups. Peace talks with the ELN were finally resumed at the end of November 2022, with the first set of meetings taking place in Venezuela, after the restoration of diplomatic contacts between the two countries. Additionaly to these attempts at peace with armed groups, exploratory talks with violent gangs, like the Shottas and Espartanos were held with government officials that could demobolise up to 2000 gang members. The preliminary truce had already accomplished to prevent any gang-related homicides in Buenaventura in over 100 days. On 1 January 2023, the government obtained a ceasefire agreement with the 5 largest armed groups still operating in Colombia, supposed to be lasting for 6 months.  The ELN for its part stated on 3 January 2023 that a mutual ceasefire is only a proposal that needs to be discussed further at an upcoming meeting at the end of January in Mexico, leading to a suspension of the ceasefire from Colombian authorities until such an agreement is reached.

Aside from these negotioations, the government wants to embark on multiple paths reducing the large social inequality in the country, among them a land redistribution plan and investments in rural infrastructure, benefitting poor rural communities. Further the government signalled its intent in investing in education for peace, tolerance and reconcilliation.

National Development Plan
On 6 February 2023, Petro announced the details of his four-year development law package, which would invest $247 billion to reduce the percentage of the population living in extreme poverty, redistribute surpluses from fossile energy sources to the renewable energy transition, and institute a land reform to increase the agricultural output, covering nearly 3 million hectares of land to be alloted to poor farmers, if passed.

Heatlh
One of his main flags, during his 2022 political campaign, was the importance of restructuring the health sector, one of the areas that affects the most Colombians, on February 23, 2023, the Minister of Health, Carolina Corcho, in which established a series of changes and the role of the EPS as well as the rest of the companies that facilitate Health.

Weeks later, the presidents of the parties, Conservative, Liberal and U, Petro's government parties, carried out analyzes of the reform as well as their contributions.

Labour
On March 17, 2023, the administration of Gustavo Petro filed, the labor reform, which would bring higher night and Sunday surcharges for workers, while it will seek that they be linked through indefinite-term contracts and that companies will be more hard to fire

“The centrality of the reform is job stability. It will guarantee the rights of the nearly 22 million employed persons. We have a text that will allow us to move towards a society that recognizes the importance of labor rights”, assured the Minister of Labor, Gloria Inés Ramírez.

The bill, which will now have to go through Congress, proposes that Colombians work 42 hours a week (today there are 48 and in July it would go to 47) that can be distributed, by mutual agreement, between employer and worker, in 5 or 6 days a week.

In addition, the night shift would not start at 9 at night, but at 6 in the afternoon, and work on Sundays or holidays would now be paid with a surcharge of 100 percent (today it is 75 percent).

Foreign policy

Venezuela
On 26 August, Petro asks his ambassador in Venezuela to establish ties with the neighboring country. The call was made during the act of possession.

"Today I take office before President Petro Gustavo as Colombian ambassador to Venezuela. We will work to normalize relations between two sister countries. Trade, border security and fraternal ties with our neighbor will be a priority," he commented on social media.

Benedetti has assured that one of his first objectives as ambassador in Venezuela will be to promote commercial exchange between neighboring nations, which will especially benefit the inhabitants of the border.

On 1 November 2022 the President of the Republic, Gustavo Petro, arrived in Caracas on Tuesday on an official visit to the Bolivarian Republic of Venezuela, where he will meet with his counterpart from that nation, Nicolás Maduro.

The Colombian Head of State arrived at the Maiquetía airport, where he was received by the Vice President of Venezuela, Delcy Rodríguez. He immediately went to Caracas and, upon arriving at the Miraflores Palace, seat of the Presidency, President Maduro was waiting for him at the main door.

At the presidential headquarters, the Parada Group formed a street of honor to welcome the Colombian President.

Next, the presidents reviewed the detachment and the Orchestra of the National System of Youth and Children's Orchestras and Choirs of Venezuela presented a cultural sample.

The presidents will have a private meeting and later, in the Ayacucho room of the Miraflores Palace, a meeting of the delegations will be held, in which issues such as the opening of the border, trade, Latin American democracy and the entry of Venezuela will be addressed. to the Inter-American Human Rights System.

The Colombian Head of State traveled accompanied by the Chief of Staff, Laura Sarabia; the Minister of Foreign Relations, Álvaro Leyva Durán; the Ambassador of Colombia in Venezuela, Armando Benedetti; the Ambassador of Venezuela in Colombia, Félix Plasencia, and the Ambassador of Colombia to the Organization of American States, Luis Ernesto Vargas.

In February 2023, Gustavo Petro and Nicolas Maduro signed a bilateral trade agreement at the Tienditas International Bridge, to support the economic integration of both countries. The agreement concerns topics like tariffs as well as investment and trade conditions.

United Nations
On 20 September, Petro addressed himself in his speech before the United Nations General Assembly. Contrary to his two predecessors, Iván Duque and Juan Manuel Santos, the speech was mainly in Spanish. It is expected that around 9:30 am, the Colombian president will begin his speech at the lectern of the UN headquarters, Petro raised the need to create a large common fund to save the Amazon. According to Petro, around $1,000 million USD must be contributed worldwide for 20 years to work for the recovery of one of the largest forests in the world. This fund would be managed, according to the Colombian president, through the United Nations, which maintained his position on the war on drugs.

In his speech he said that:

pointed to the rich countries and the functioning of contemporary society to be destroying the jungle with their addictions to drugs and consumption. "Which is more poisonous to humanity, cocaine, coal or oil?" she asked.

Petro concluded his intervention by asking Ukraine and Russia to make peace. "Only in peace can we save life in this land of ours. There is no total peace, without social, economic and environmental justice. We are at war, too, with the planet. Without peace with the planet, there will be no peace among nations. Without social justice, there is no social peace," he stated.

Nicaragua
In April 2022, the ICJ issued a ruling that declared in its title that Colombia violated the sovereign rights of Nicaragua. The ruling demanded that Colombia "immediately cease" fishing activities in Nicaraguan territory, something that the government of Daniel Ortega celebrated.

Nicaragua assures that from its coasts there is an uninterrupted natural prolongation of the continent that extends beyond its 200 nautical miles. It argues that this gives it the right to increase its platform, despite the fact that it overlaps with the 200 nautical miles that correspond to Colombia from its continental coasts. At the center of the claim are gas and oil from the seafloor.

Colombia alleges that it has never ratified the United Nations Convention on the Law of the Sea, which recognizes continental shelves. Nicaragua responds that their claims are also recognized in customary law, based on legal customs of the States that are accepted as binding. However, the Andean country affirms that this is not true, since customary law refers to general principles and not to the technicalities of the delimitation of territories.

Days later, the Government of Colombia, through a statement made by the Minister of Foreign Affairs, Álvaro Leyva, responded "We were programming the sending of the Colombian ambassador to Managua, but I understand that they are not liking the last position”.

He assured that Colombia's position has always been to ensure human rights, "That's why we wanted to go there, so that it could get on the wagon of the new politics and geopolitics that is being designed in the American continent."

Meanwhile, the foreign minister in the conversation spoke about an end to the relationship with Nicaragua, "for now, it seems that they are suspended."

Guatemala
On January 17, 2023, the Guatemalan prosecutor's office ordered the capture of Iván Velásquez, Minister of Defense who had previously served as Head of the International Commission against Impunity in Guatemala, and who allegedly carried out and disclosed information on investigations against corruption carried out at various Central American heads of state.

Petro assured that they will defend Iván Velásquez, Minister of Defense, in light of the accusations made against him by the Public Ministry of Guatemala. He warned that the actions taken could jeopardize diplomatic relations between the two countries.

Velásquez served in that country as head of the International Commission against Impunity in Guatemala until the beginning of 2019 when he was expelled by President Jimmy Morales, along with other investigators. During his tenure, more than 70 criminal structures were dismantled and more than 600 prosecuted. The most prominent was the one known as La Línea, whose investigation led President Otto Pérez Molina and Vice President Roxana Baldeti to prison.

According to President Petro, it was these investigations that are now persecuting the current Minister of National Defense. “Like any person who fights against corruption, who takes a vanguard role, and Minister Velásquez did so when he was appointed to the United Nations independent judicial commission to destroy the impunity that dominated, and still dominates, the Republic of Guatemala. , because now he is persecuted by that type of interest that touched, "said the Colombian president.

Petro pointed out that, contrary to what the Public Ministry now affirms, Velásquez caused a rupture of the powerful and corrupt interests of that country to "discover ways of greater transparency, where they can truly be the owners of power and not the criminals." ”.

Notes

References

External links

Petro, Gustavo
Presidency of Gustavo Petro
Gustavo Petro
2022 establishments in Colombia
2020s in Colombia
Petro